The 1994–95 Iowa State Cyclones men's basketball team represented Iowa State University during the 1994–95 NCAA Division I men's basketball season. The Cyclones were coached by Tim Floyd, who was in his 1st season. They played their home games at Hilton Coliseum in Ames, Iowa.

They finished the season 23–11, 6–8 in Big Eight play to finish in 5th place. Their 23 wins were a school record at the time.  They defeated #17 Missouri and #2 Kansas but lost to #19 Oklahoma State in the 1995 Big Eight conference tournament championship. They earned an at-large bid to the NCAA tournament and a #7 seed. In the tournament they defeated Florida and lost to North Carolina in the second round who would advance onto the Final Four.

Games were televised by ESPN, Big 8 (Creative Sports), the Cyclone Television Network, the Hawkeye Television Network and the UNI Television Network (KWWL).

Previous season
The previous season the Cyclones finished the season 14–13, 4–10 in Big Eight play to finish in 7th place.  They defeated #23 Oklahoma State in the 1994 Big Eight conference tournament quarterfinals.

Following the 1993–94 season, head coach Johnny Orr retired after 14 seasons at Iowa State. The Cyclones then hired University of New Orleans head coach, Tim Floyd. Floyd had gone 127–58 over six season with the Privateers including two NCAA tournament appearances. He is one of only four Division I coaches who have won four conference championships in the first five years at their school.

Roster

Schedule and results

|-
!colspan=6 style=""|Regular Season

|-

|-
!colspan=6 style=""|Regular Season

|-

|-

|-

|-

|-

|-

|-

|-

|-

|-

|-

|-

|-

|-

|-

|-

|-

|-

|-

|-

|-

|-

|-

|-

|-

|-

|-

|-

|-
!colspan=12 style=""|Big Eight tournament

|-

|-

|-
!colspan=12 style=""|NCAA Tournament

|-

|-

Awards and honors

All-Americans

Fred Hoiberg (HM)

Academic All-Americans

Fred Hoiberg (First Team)

All-Big Eight Selections

Fred Hoiberg (First Team)
Loren Meyer (HM)
Julius Michalik (HM)

All-Big Eight tournament Team

Hurl Beechum
Loren Meyer

Ralph A. Olsen Award

Fred Hoiberg

NBA draft

References

Iowa State Cyclones men's basketball seasons
Iowa State
Iowa State
Iowa State Cyc
Iowa State Cyc